Aram-Naharaim ( ʾĂram Nahărayīm; ; "Aram between (the) rivers") is the biblical term for the ancient land of the Arameans referring to the region along the great bend of the Euphrates river. Aram-Naharaim is also mentioned as Nahrima of the Arameans in the El-Amarna letters. 

It is mentioned five times in the Hebrew Bible or Old Testament. In Genesis, it is used somewhat interchangeably with the names Paddan Aram and Haran to denote the place where Abraham stayed briefly with his father Terah's family after leaving Ur of the Chaldees, while en route to Canaan (Gen. 11:31), and the place from which later patriarchs obtained wives, rather than marry daughters of Canaan.

Both the Septuagint (early Greek translation of the Hebrew Bible) and Flavius Josephus translate the name as Mesopotamia. Ancient writers later used the name "Mesopotamia" for all of the land between the Tigris and Euphrates. However, the usage of the Hebrew name "Aram-Naharaim" does not match this later usage of "Mesopotamia", the Hebrew term referring to a northern region within Mesopotamia.

The translation of the name as "Mesopotamia" was not consistent – the Septuagint also uses a more precise translation "Mesopotamia of Syria" as well as "Rivers of Syria".

During the Late Antiquity and throughout the Early Medieval period, regional dialect of Aramaic language was called Nahraya, an endonymic (native) term, derived from choronym (regional name) Bet-Nahrain, a variant Aramaic name for Mesopotamians regions in general.

See also

 Aram (region)
 Arameans
 Chushan-Rishathaim
 Paddan Aram
 Upper Mesopotamia

Notes

References

Sources

External links
 The Land of Aram (Syria)

Aramean states
History of Aram (region)
Torah places
Hebrew Bible regions
Historical regions